The 1997 Cincinnati Reds season consisted of the Cincinnati Reds' MLB season in the National League Central. The Reds were managed by Ray Knight and then Jack McKeon.

Offseason
December 13, 1996: Pete Rose Jr. was signed as a free agent with the Cincinnati Reds.
December 21, 1996: Stan Belinda was signed as a free agent with the Cincinnati Reds.
December 23, 1996: Rikkert Faneyte was sent to the Cincinnati Reds by the Texas Rangers as part of a conditional deal.
January 27, 1997: Terry Pendleton was signed as a free agent with the Cincinnati Reds.
February 8, 1997: Joe Oliver was signed as a free agent with the Cincinnati Reds.
March 27, 1997: Scott Service was selected off waivers by the Oakland Athletics from the Cincinnati Reds.

Regular season

Season standings

Record vs. opponents

Notable transactions
April 4, 1997: Scott Service was selected off waivers by the Cincinnati Reds from the Oakland Athletics.
June 3, 1997: DeWayne Wise was drafted by the Cincinnati Reds in the 5th round of the 1997 amateur draft. Player signed June 5, 1997.
July 15, 1997: Chris Stynes was traded by the Kansas City Royals with Jon Nunnally to the Cincinnati Reds for Hector Carrasco and Scott Service.
July 24, 1997: Terry Pendleton was released by the Cincinnati Reds.
July 31, 1997: John Smiley was traded by the Cincinnati Reds with Jeff Branson to the Cleveland Indians for Jim Crowell, Danny Graves, Damian Jackson, and Scott Winchester.

Roster

Game log

|-  style="text-align:center; background:#bfb;"
| 1 || April 1 || Colorado Rockies || 11 – 4 || || || || 54,820 || 1-0 
|-  style="text-align:center; background:#bfb;"
| 2 || April 2 || Colorado Rockies || 5 – 3 || || || || 20,210 || 2-0 
|-  style="text-align:center; background:#fbb;"
| 3 || April 3 || Colorado Rockies || 7 – 1 || || || || 22,660 || 2-1 
|-  style="text-align:center; background:#bfb;"
| 4 || April 4 || Florida Marlins || 9 – 7 || || || || 25,039 || 3-1 
|-  style="text-align:center; background:#fbb;"
| 5 || April 5 || Florida Marlins || 4 – 3 || || || || 38,598 || 3-2 
|-  style="text-align:center; background:#fbb;"
| 6 || April 6 || Florida Marlins || 3 – 2 || || || || 36,146 || 3-3 
|-  style="text-align:center; background:#fbb;"
| 7 || April 7 || Colorado Rockies || 13 – 2 || || || || 48,014 || 3-4 
|-  style="text-align:center; background:#fbb;"
| 8 || April 9 || Colorado Rockies || 13 – 4 || || || || 50,095 || 3-5 
|-  style="text-align:center; background:#fbb;"
| 9 || April 11 || Florida Marlins || 10 – 0 || || || || 21,240 || 3-6 
|-  style="text-align:center; background:#bfb;"
| 10 || April 12 || Florida Marlins || 2 – 1 || || || || 21,466 || 4-6 
|-  style="text-align:center; background:#bfb;"
| 11 || April 13 || Florida Marlins || 6 – 4 || || || || 17,687 || 5-6 
|-  style="text-align:center; background:#fbb;"
| 12 || April 14 || Atlanta Braves  || 15 – 5 || || || || 31,427 || 5-7 
|-  style="text-align:center; background:#fbb;"
| 13 || April 15 || Atlanta Braves  || 3 – 0 || || || || 31,962 || 5-8 
|-  style="text-align:center; background:#fbb;"
| 14 || April 16 || Atlanta Braves  || 7 – 1 || || || || 38,411 || 5-9 
|-  style="text-align:center; background:#fbb;"
| 15 || April 17 || Pittsburgh Pirates || 3 – 2 || || || || 6,039 || 5-10 
|-  style="text-align:center; background:#bfb;"
| 16 || April 18 || Pittsburgh Pirates || 6 – 1 || || || || 9,082 || 6-10 
|-  style="text-align:center; background:#fbb;"
| 17 || April 19 || Pittsburgh Pirates || 6 – 5 || || || || 11,457 || 6-11 
|-  style="text-align:center; background:#fbb;"
| 18 || April 20 || Pittsburgh Pirates || 5 – 3 || || || || 14,542 || 6-12 
|-  style="text-align:center; background:#fbb;"
| 19 || April 22 || New York Mets || 7 – 2 || || || || 14,585 || 6-13 
|-  style="text-align:center; background:#fbb;"
| 20 || April 23 || New York Mets || 10 – 2 || || || || 26,492 || 6-14 
|-  style="text-align:center; background:#fbb;"
| 21 || April 25 || Philadelphia Phillies || 10 – 7 || || || || 22,843 || 6-15 
|-  style="text-align:center; background:#bfb;"
| 22 || April 26 || Philadelphia Phillies || 10 – 2 || || || || 27,357 || 7-15 
|-  style="text-align:center; background:#fbb;"
| 23 || April 28 || New York Mets || 15 – 2 || || || || 15,572 || 7-16 
|-  style="text-align:center; background:#fbb;"
| 24 || April 29 || New York Mets || 3 – 1 || || || || 17,699 || 7-17 
|-  style="text-align:center; background:#fbb;"
| 25 || April 30 || Atlanta Braves || 12 – 3 || || || ||  18,278 || 7-18 
|-

|-  style="text-align:center; background:#fbb;"
| 26 || 1 May || Atlanta Braves || 4 – 2 || || || || 19,991 || 7-19 
|-  style="text-align:center; background:#bfb;"
| 27 || 2 May || San Francisco Giants || 6 – 2 || || || || 11,959 || 8-19 
|-  style="text-align:center; background:#bfb;"
| 28 || 3 May || San Francisco Giants || 3 – 1 || || || || 18,149 || 9-19 
|-  style="text-align:center; background:#fbb;"
| 29 || 4 May || San Francisco Giants || 2 – 1 || || || || 26,287 || 9-20 
|-  style="text-align:center; background:#fbb;"
| 30 || 5 May || Los Angeles Dodgers || 3 – 1 || || || || 26,955 || 9-21 
|-  style="text-align:center; background:#bfb;"
| 31 || 6 May || Los Angeles Dodgers || 3 – 2 || || || || 38,241 || 10-21 
|-  style="text-align:center; background:#fbb;"
| 32 || 7 May || Los Angeles Dodgers || 4 – 2 || || || || 28,303 || 10-22 
|-  style="text-align:center; background:#bfb;"
| 33 || 9 May || San Diego Padres || 7 – 2 || || || || 22,695 || 11-22 
|-  style="text-align:center; background:#fbb;"
| 34 || 10 May || San Diego Padres || 9 – 6 || || || || 24,739 || 11-23 
|-  style="text-align:center; background:#fbb;"
| 35 || 11 May || San Diego Padres || 5 – 4 || || || || 31,539 || 11-24 
|-  style="text-align:center; background:#fbb;"
| 36 || 13 May || San Francisco Giants || 4 – 1 || || || || 17,828 || 11-25 
|-  style="text-align:center; background:#fbb;"
| 37 || 14 May || San Francisco Giants || 4 – 2 || || || || 16,404 || 11-26 
|-  style="text-align:center; background:#fbb;"
| 38 || 15 May || Los Angeles Dodgers || 2 – 1 || || || || 16,986 || 11-27 
|-  style="text-align:center; background:#bfb;"
| 39 || 16 May || Los Angeles Dodgers || 4 – 2 || || || || 24,556 || 12-27 
|-  style="text-align:center; background:#fbb;"
| 40 || 17 May || San Diego Padres || 6 – 2 || || || || 21,469 || 12-28 
|-  style="text-align:center; background:#bfb;"
| 41 || 18 May || San Diego Padres || 5 – 0 || || || || 23,265 || 13-28 
|-  style="text-align:center; background:#fbb;"
| 42 || 19 May || San Diego Padres || 13 – 6 || || || || 17,898 || 13-29 
|-  style="text-align:center; background:#bfb;"
| 43 || 20 May || Houston Astros || 7 – 4 || || || || 14,954 || 14-29 
|-  style="text-align:center; background:#fbb;"
| 44 || 21 May || Houston Astros || 4 – 3 || || || || 15,088 || 14-30 
|-  style="text-align:center; background:#fbb;"
| 45 || 23 May || Chicago Cubs || 3 – 1 || || || || 23,189 || 14-31 
|-  style="text-align:center; background:#bfb;"
| 46 || 24 May || Chicago Cubs || 4 – 1 || || || ||  26,887 || 15-31 
|-  style="text-align:center; background:#bfb;"
| 47 || 25 May || Chicago Cubs || 7 – 5 || || || || 26,844 || 16-31 
|-  style="text-align:center; background:#bfb;"
| 48 || 26 May || Philadelphia Phillies || 8 – 5 || || || || 0 || 17-31 
|-  style="text-align:center; background:#bfb;"
| 49 || 26 May || Philadelphia Phillies || 8 – 4 || || || || 16,798 || 18-31 
|-  style="text-align:center; background:#fbb;"
| 50 || 27 May || Philadelphia Phillies || 2 – 1 || || || || 17,297 || 18-32 
|-  style="text-align:center; background:#bfb;"
| 51 || 28 May || Philadelphia Phillies || 2 – 0 || || || || 15,451 || 19-32 
|-  style="text-align:center; background:#fbb;"
| 52 || 29 May || Chicago Cubs || 2 – 1 || || || || 23,005 || 19-33 
|-  style="text-align:center; background:#bfb;"
| 53 || 30 May || Chicago Cubs || 5 – 1 || || || || 21,267 || 20-33 
|-  style="text-align:center; background:#fbb;"
| 54 || 31 May || Chicago Cubs || 7 – 4 || || || || 36,440 || 20-34 
|-

|-  style="text-align:center; background:#fbb;"
| 55 || June 1 || Chicago Cubs || 7 – 1 || || || || 28849 || 20-35 
|-  style="text-align:center; background:#bfb;"
| 56 || June 3 || Philadelphia Phillies || 3 – 2 || || || || 14340 || 21-35 
|-  style="text-align:center; background:#fbb;"
| 57 || June 4 || Houston Astros || 2 – 5 || || || || 18849 || 21-36 
|-  style="text-align:center; background:#bfb;"
| 58 || June 5 || Houston Astros || 6 – 5 || || || || 22437 || 22-36 
|-  style="text-align:center; background:#bfb;"
| 59 || June 6 || New York Mets || 5 – 2 || || || || 21339 || 23-36 
|-  style="text-align:center; background:#bfb;"
| 60 || June 7 || New York Mets || 10 – 5 || || || || 23830 || 24-36 
|-  style="text-align:center; background:#fbb;"
| 61 || June 9 || New York Mets || 4 – 2 || || || || 23079 || 24-37 
|-  style="text-align:center; background:#bfb;"
| 62 || June 10 || Pittsburgh Pirates || 8 – 5 || || || || 18556 || 25-37 
|-  style="text-align:center; background:#bfb;"
| 63 || June 11 || Pittsburgh Pirates || 2 – 1 || || || || 20854 || 26-37 
|-  style="text-align:center; background:#fbb;"
| 64 || June 13 || Chicago White Sox || 3 – 1 || || || || 31682 || 26-38 
|-  style="text-align:center; background:#bfb;"
| 65 || June 14 || Chicago White Sox || 5 – 1 || || || || 36685 || 27-38 
|-  style="text-align:center; background:#fbb;"
| 66 || June 15 || Chicago White Sox || 14 – 6 || || || || 31663 || 27-39 
|-  style="text-align:center; background:#bfb;"
| 67 || June 16 || Cleveland Indians || 4 – 1 || || || || 42961 || 28-39 
|-  style="text-align:center; background:#fbb;"
| 68 || June 17 || Cleveland Indians || 5 – 1 || || || || 42901 || 28-40 
|-  style="text-align:center; background:#bfb;"
| 69 || June 18 || Cleveland Indians || 5 – 2 || || || || 42865 || 29-40 
|-  style="text-align:center; background:#bfb;"
| 70 || June 20 || St. Louis Cardinals || 4 – 2 || || || || 42091 || 30-40 
|-  style="text-align:center; background:#fbb;"
| 71 || June 21 || St. Louis Cardinals || 6 – 2 || || || || 44931 || 30-41 
|-  style="text-align:center; background:#fbb;"
| 72 || June 22 || St. Louis Cardinals || 5 – 2 || || || || 43194 || 30-42 
|-  style="text-align:center; background:#fbb;"
| 73 || June 23 || Montréal Expos || 5 – 0 || || || || 12367 || 30-43 
|-  style="text-align:center; background:#bfb;"
| 74 || June 24 || Montréal Expos || 7 – 6 || || || || 13141 || 31-43 
|-  style="text-align:center; background:#bfb;"
| 75 || June 25 || Montréal Expos || 2 – 1 || || || || 12407 || 32-43 
|-  style="text-align:center; background:#fbb;"
| 76 || June 26 || St. Louis Cardinals || 5 – 3 || || || || 20116 || 32-44 
|-  style="text-align:center; background:#bfb;"
| 77 || June 27 || St. Louis Cardinals || 5 = 3 || || || || 28317 || 33-44 
|-  style="text-align:center; background:#fbb;"
| 78 || June 28 || St. Louis Cardinals || 12 – 6 || || || || 24390 || 33-45 
|-  style="text-align:center; background:#fbb;"
| 79 || June 29 || St. Louis Cardinals || 6 – 5 || || || || 24216 || 33-46 
|-  style="text-align:center; background:#bfb;"
| 80 || June 30 || Milwaukee Brewers || 4 – 3 || || || || 19866 || 34-46 
|-

|-  style="text-align:center; background:#bfb;"
| 81 || July 1 || Milwaukee Brewers || 9:1 || || || || 21264 || 35-46 
|-  style="text-align:center; background:#bfb;"
| 82 || July 2 || Milwaukee Brewers || 7:4 || || || || 27866 || 36-46 
|-  style="text-align:center; background:#bfb;"
| 83 || July 3 || Houston Astros || 4:3 || || || || 14708 || 37-46 
|-  style="text-align:center; background:#bfb;"
| 84 || July 4 || Houston Astros || 4:2 || || || || 34080 || 38-46 
|-  style="text-align:center; background:#fbb;"
| 85 || July 5 || Houston Astros || 1:2 || || || || 24022 || 38-47 
|-  style="text-align:center; background:#fbb;"
| 86 || July 6 || Houston Astros || 5:6 || || || || 25564 || 38-48 
|-  style="text-align:center; background:#fbb;"
| 87 || July 11 || Montréal Expos || 2:5 || || || || 25915 || 38-49 
|-  style="text-align:center; background:#bfb;"
| 88 || July 12 || Montréal Expos || 4:3 || || || || 25744 || 39-49 
|-  style="text-align:center; background:#fbb;"
| 89 || July 13 || Montréal Expos || 0:2 || || || || 22293 || 39-50 
|-  style="text-align:center; background:#bfb;"
| 90 || July 14 || St. Louis Cardinals || 4:2 || || || || 19405 || 40-50 
|-  style="text-align:center; background:#fbb;"
| 91 || July 15 || St. Louis Cardinals || 4:7 || || || || 21232 || 40-51 
|-  style="text-align:center; background:#bfb;"
| 92 || July 16 || Pittsburgh Pirates || 7:3 || || || || 30698 || 41-51 
|-  style="text-align:center; background:#bfb;"
| 93 || July 17 || Pittsburgh Pirates || 9:5 || || || || 19710 || 42-51 
|-  style="text-align:center; background:#fbb;"
| 94 || July 18 || New York Mets || 3:4 || || || || 22901 || 42-52 
|-  style="text-align:center; background:#fbb;"
| 95 || July 19 || New York Mets || 3:5 || || || || 26675 || 42-53 
|-  style="text-align:center; background:#fbb;"
| 96 || July 20 || New York Mets || 1:10 || || || || 36259 || 42-54 
|-  style="text-align:center; background:#fbb;"
| 97 || July 21 || New York Mets || 3:5 || || || || 22172 || 42-55 
|-  style="text-align:center; background:#bfb;"
| 98 || July 22 || Florida Marlins || 7:6 || || || || 19547 || 43-55 
|-  style="text-align:center; background:#fbb;"
| 99 || July 23 || Florida Marlins || 1:8 || || || || 20371 || 43-56 
|-  style="text-align:center; background:#fbb;"
| 100 || July 25 || Atlanta Braves || 3:7 || || || || 34931 || 43-57 
|-  style="text-align:center; background:#bfb;"
| 101 || July 26 || Atlanta Braves || 7:6 || || || || 33115 || 44-57 
|-  style="text-align:center; background:#fbb;"
| 102 || July 27 || Atlanta Braves || 2:3 || || || || 30167 || 44-58 
|-  style="text-align:center; background:#bfb;"
| 103 || July 28 || Florida Marlins || 4:0 || || || || 18393 || 45-58 
|-  style="text-align:center; background:#fbb;"
| 104 || July 29 || Florida Marlins || 1:7 || || || || 20745 || 45-59 
|-  style="text-align:center; background:#fbb;"
| 105 || July 30 || Florida Marlins || 0:6 || || || || 21373 || 45-60 
|-

|-  style="text-align:center; background:#fbb;"
| 106 || August 1 || San Francisco Giants || 7:8 || || || || 25636 || 45-61 
|-  style="text-align:center; background:#bfb;"
| 107 || August 2 || San Francisco Giants || 5:1 || || || || 23266 || 46-61 
|-  style="text-align:center; background:#fbb;"
| 108 || August 3 || San Francisco Giants || 3:8 || || || || 21272 || 46-62 
|-  style="text-align:center; background:#fbb;"
| 109 || August 4 || San Francisco Giants || 1:9 || || || || 17930 || 46-63 
|-  style="text-align:center; background:#bfb;"
| 110 || August 5 || San Diego Padres || 7:3 || || || || 17797 || 47-63 
|-  style="text-align:center; background:#fbb;"
| 111 || August 6 || San Diego Padres || 3:6 || || || || 18218 || 47-64 
|-  style="text-align:center; background:#bfb;"
| 112 || August 7 || San Diego Padres || 7:0 || || || || 17458 || 48-64 
|-  style="text-align:center; background:#fbb;"
| 113 || August 8 || Los Angeles Dodgers || 5:10 || || || || 26837 || 48-65 
|-  style="text-align:center; background:#bfb;"
| 114 || August 9 || Los Angeles Dodgers || 3:2 || || || || 30809 || 49-65 
|-  style="text-align:center; background:#bfb;"
| 115 || August 10 || Los Angeles Dodgers || 8:1 || || || || 24742 || 50-65 
|-  style="text-align:center; background:#bfb;"
| 116 || August 11 || San Francisco Giants || 7:4 || || || || 19086 || 51-65 
|-  style="text-align:center; background:#fbb;"
| 117 || August 12 || San Francisco Giants || 3:7 || || || || 15890 || 51-66 
|-  style="text-align:center; background:#bfb;"
| 118 || August 13 || San Diego Padres || 2:0 || || || || 15218 || 52-66 
|-  style="text-align:center; background:#fbb;"
| 119 || August 14 || San Diego Padres || 4:5 || || || || 16774 || 52-67 
|-  style="text-align:center; background:#bfb;"
| 120 || August 15 || Los Angeles Dodgers || 5:3 || || || || 46711 || 53-67 
|-  style="text-align:center; background:#fbb;"
| 121 || August 16 || Los Angeles Dodgers || 3:5 || || || || 53464 || 53-68 
|-  style="text-align:center; background:#bfb;"
| 122 || August 17 || Los Angeles Dodgers || 5:0 || || || || 51245 || 54-68 
|-  style="text-align:center; background:#bfb;"
| 123 || August 19 || Colorado Rockies || 6:5 || || || || 31722 || 55-68 
|-  style="text-align:center; background:#fbb;"
| 124 || August 20 || Colorado Rockies || 3:5 || || || || 21968 || 55-69 
|-  style="text-align:center; background:#fbb;"
| 125 || August 22 || Atlanta Braves || 2:6 || || || || 48937 || 55-70 
|-  style="text-align:center; background:#fbb;"
| 126 || August 23 || Atlanta Braves || 3:10 || || || || 48499 || 55-71 
|-  style="text-align:center; background:#bfb;"
| 127 || August 24 || Atlanta Braves || 6:4 || || || || 45577 || 56-71 
|-  style="text-align:center; background:#bfb;"
| 128 || August 25 || Colorado Rockies || 7:6 || || || || 48143 || 57-71 
|-  style="text-align:center; background:#bfb;"
| 129 || August 25 || Colorado Rockies || 6:4 || || || || 48081 || 58-71 
|-  style="text-align:center; background:#fbb;"
| 130 || August 26 || Colorado Rockies || 5:9 || || || || 48063 || 58-72 
|-  style="text-align:center; background:#fbb;"
| 131 || August 27 || Colorado Rockies || 5:7 || || || || 48032 || 58-73 
|-  style="text-align:center; background:#bfb;"
| 132 || August 29 || Minnesota Twins || 5:3 || || || || 12155 || 59-73 
|-  style="text-align:center; background:#fbb;"
| 133 || August 30 || Minnesota Twins || 1:4 || || || || 17831 || 59-74 
|-  style="text-align:center; background:#fbb;"
| 134 || August 31 || Minnesota Twins || 6:8 || || || || 13092 || 59-75 
|-

|-  style="text-align:center; background:#fbb;"
| 135 || September 1 || Kansas City Royals || 7 – 4 || || || || 31,920 || 59-76 
|-  style="text-align:center; background:#bfb;"
| 136 || September 2 || Kansas City Royals || 4:0 || || || || 15,288 || 60-76 
|-  style="text-align:center; background:#bfb;"
| 137 || September 3 || Kansas City Royals || 6:3 || || || || 16,285 || 61-76 
|-  style="text-align:center; background:#bfb;"
| 138 || September 4 || Pittsburgh Pirates || 5:2 || || || || 15,136 || 62-76 
|-  style="text-align:center; background:#bfb;"
| 139 || September 5 || Pittsburgh Pirates || 8:6 || || || || 21,492 || 63-76 
|-  style="text-align:center; background:#fbb;"
| 140 || September 6 || Pittsburgh Pirates || 4:13 || || || || 20,383 || 63-77 
|-  style="text-align:center; background:#bfb;"
| 141 || September 7 || Pittsburgh Pirates || 6:3 || || || || 19,682 || 64-77 
|-  style="text-align:center; background:#fbb;"
| 142 || September 8 || Chicago Cubs || 1:8 ||  || || || 15,337 || 64-78 
|-  style="text-align:center; background:#bfb;"
| 143 || September 9 || Chicago Cubs || 5:2 || || || || 15,349 || 65-78 
|-  style="text-align:center; background:#fbb;"
| 144 || September 10 || Chicago Cubs || 1:3 || || || || 16,200 || 65-79 
|-  style="text-align:center; background:#bfb;"
| 145 || September 12 || Philadelphia Phillies || 4:2 || || || || 0 || 66-79 
|-  style="text-align:center; background:#fbb;"
| 146 || September 12 || Philadelphia Phillies || 1:9 || || || || 17,546 || 66-80 
|-  style="text-align:center; background:#bfb;"
| 147 || September 13 || Philadelphia Phillies || 3:0 || || || || 15,524 || 67-80 
|-  style="text-align:center; background:#bfb;"
| 148 || September 14 || Philadelphia Phillies || 6:4 || || || || 20,518 || 68-80 
|-  style="text-align:center; background:#bfb;"
| 149 || September 15 || Chicago Cubs || 4 – 1 || || || || 20,352 || 69-80 
|-  style="text-align:center; background:#fbb;"
| 150 || September 16 || Chicago Cubs || 5 – 0 || || || || 22,190 || 69-81 
|-  style="text-align:center; background:#fbb;"
| 151 || September 17 || Montréal Expos || 4 – 1 || || || || 15,757 || 69-82 
|-  style="text-align:center; background:#bfb;"
| 152 || September 18 || Montréal Expos || 6 – 3 || || || || 15,099 || 70-82 
|-  style="text-align:center; background:#bfb;"
| 153 || September 19 || Houston Astros || 5 – 4 || || || || 21,791 || 71-82 
|-  style="text-align:center; background:#fbb;"
| 154 || September 20 || Houston Astros || 4 – 1 || || || || 20,197 || 71-83 
|-  style="text-align:center; background:#fbb;"
| 155 || September 21 || Houston Astros || 8 – 3 || || || || 22,652 || 71-84 
|-  style="text-align:center; background:#fbb;"
| 156 || September 22 || Houston Astros || 6 – 3 || || || || 17,411 || 71-85 
|-  style="text-align:center; background:#bfb;"
| 157 || September 23 || St. Louis Cardinals || 8 – 6 || || || || 22,045 || 72-85 
|-  style="text-align:center; background:#bfb;"
| 158 || September 24 || St. Louis Cardinals || 5 – 4 || || || || 23,308 || 73-85 
|-  style="text-align:center; background:#bfb;"
| 159 || September 25 || St. Louis Cardinals || 4 – 3 || || || || 30,938 || 74-85 
|-  style="text-align:center; background:#bfb;"
| 160 || September 26 || Montreal Expos || 7 – 1 || || || || 17,430 || 75-85 
|-  style="text-align:center; background:#fbb;"
| 161 || September 27 || Montreal Expos || 8 – 5 || || || || 14,708 || 75-86 
|-  style="text-align:center; background:#bfb;"
| 162 || September 28 || Montreal Expos || 11 – 3 || || || || 15,477 || 76-86 
|-

Player stats

Batting

Starters by position
Note: Pos = Position; G = Games played; AB = At bats; H = Hits; Avg. = Batting average; HR = Home runs; RBI = Runs batted in

Other batters 
Note: G = Games played; AB = At bats; H = Hits; Avg. = Batting average; HR = Home runs; RBI = Runs batted in

Pitching

Starting pitchers 
Note: G = Games pitched; IP = Innings pitched; W = Wins; L = Losses; ERA = Earned run average; SO = Strikeouts

Other pitchers 
Note: G = Games pitched; IP = Innings pitched; W = Wins; L = Losses; ERA = Earned run average; SO = Strikeouts

Relief pitchers 
Note: G = Games pitched; W = Wins; L = Losses; SV = Saves; ERA = Earned run average; SO = Strikeouts

Awards and records
Bret Boone, National League Record, Best Fielding Average in One Season by a National League Second Baseman (.997)
1997 Major League Baseball All-Star Game
 Barry Larkin, shortstop, starter

Farm system 

LEAGUE CHAMPIONS: Billings

Notes

References
1997 Cincinnati Reds season at Baseball Reference

Cincinnati Reds season
Cincinnati Reds seasons
Cinc